Surjo Prithibir Chardike Ghore (English translation: Sun Goes Around the Earth) is an Indian Bengali film directed by Arijit Biswas and based on the life of K. C. Paul. It is produced by AVA Film Productions. The movie was theatrically released on 29 November 2019.

Cast 

Meghnad Bhattacharya as TC Paul
Chiranjeet Chakraborty
 Anjan Dutt
 Pallavi Chatterjee
 Paran Bandhopadhyay
 Kabir Suman

References 

2019 films
Bengali-language Indian films
2010s Bengali-language films